This Darkened Heart is the second studio album by the metalcore band All That Remains, released on March 23, 2004. It includes the singles "This Darkened Heart", "Tattered on My Sleeve" and "The Deepest Gray", all three of which had music videos created for them. The album was produced by Killswitch Engage guitarist Adam Dutkiewicz, who previously produced the band's debut.

This Darkened Heart is the first All That Remains album to feature current rhythm guitarist Mike Martin, the last album to feature drummer Michael Bartlett, and the only album to feature bassist Matt Deis who left the band in 2005 and then rejoined in 2022.

Musical style
This Darkened Heart marks a shift in the band's sound, moving away from the melodic death metal sound of Behind Silence and Solitude to more of a metalcore sound. Additionally, some of the songs feature clean vocals.

Track listing

Personnel
All That Remains
 Philip Labonte – vocals
 Mike Martin – guitar
 Oli Herbert – electric and acoustic guitars
 Matt Deis – bass, piano
 Michael Bartlett – drums

Additional
 Adam Dutkiewicz – producer, engineer, mixing
 Louie Teran – mastering
 Mike D'Antonio – artwork

References

2004 albums
All That Remains (band) albums
Prosthetic Records albums
Razor & Tie albums
Albums produced by Adam Dutkiewicz